The Maersk Peary is a tanker, operated by the shipping firm Maersk Line, that was designed for working in the polar regions.

History

She was built in 2004 by STX Offshore & Shipbuilding Jinhae-gu, South Korea, originally with a red hull and registered in Norway as the MT Jutul. In 2011, Maersk won a long-term contract to supply Thule AFB, in Greenland and McMurdo Station, in Antarctica, and the Maersk Peary was reflagged as an American vessel and painted blue, sailing with an American crew. The vessel was then leased to the Military Sealift Command.

Images

References

Auxiliary ships of the United States Navy
2004 ships
Unique oilers and tankers of the United States Navy
Tankers of Norway
Ships built by STX Offshore & Shipbuilding
Ships of the Maersk Line